Krasnodubrovsky is a rural locality (a settlement) in Zavyalovsky Selsoviet, Zavyalovsky District, Altai Krai, Russia. The population was 203 as of 2013. There are 6 streets.

Geography 
Krasnodubrovsky is located 14 km northwest of Zavyalovo (the district's administrative centre) by road. Malinovsky is the nearest rural locality.

References 

Rural localities in Zavyalovsky District, Altai Krai